Earl of Burlington is a title that has been created twice, the first time in the Peerage of England in 1664 and the second in the Peerage of the United Kingdom in 1831. Since 1858, Earl of Burlington has been a courtesy title used by the dukes of Devonshire, traditionally borne by the duke's grandson, who is the eldest son of the duke's eldest son, the marquess of Hartington.

History

The first creation was for Richard Boyle, 2nd Earl of Cork, on 20 March 1664 (see the Earl of Cork for earlier history of the family). He had previously been created Baron Clifford of Londesborough , in the County of York, on 4 November 1644, also in the Peerage of England. Lord Burlington was the husband of Elizabeth Clifford, 2nd Baroness Clifford. Their eldest son Charles Boyle, Viscount Dungarvan, succeeded his mother as third Baron Clifford in 1691 but predeceased his father. Lord Burlington was therefore succeeded by his grandson (the son of Viscount Dungarvan), the third Earl of Cork and second Earl of Burlington. He had already succeeded his father as fourth Baron Clifford in 1694. His only son, the 3rd Earl of Burlington and 4th Earl of Cork, was the famous architect and patron. He had two daughters but no sons and on his death in 1753 the barony of Clifford of Lanesborough and earldom of Burlington became extinct. He was succeeded in the earldom of Cork by his third cousin, the fifth Earl of Orrery (see the Earl of Cork for further history of these titles).

Lord Burlington was succeeded in his Burlington estates and in the barony of Clifford (which could be passed on through female lines) by his daughter Charlotte, the sixth baroness. She was the wife of the 4th duke of Devonshire. On 10 September 1831, the earldom of Burlington was revived when their third and youngest son Lord George Cavendish was created Baron Cavendish of Keighley, in the County of York, and Earl of Burlington, in the Peerage of the United Kingdom. In 1858, his grandson, the second Earl, succeeded his first cousin once removed as seventh Duke of Devonshire. Since then, Earl of Burlington has traditionally been used as a courtesy title by the Duke of Devonshire's grandson (Marquess of Hartington is the title used by the heir apparent). Bill Burlington has opted to remain known as Earl of Burlington instead of Marquess of Hartington as he could have done following the death of his grandfather in 2014.

Earls of Burlington; First creation (1664)
Richard Boyle, 1st Earl of Burlington, 2nd Earl of Cork (1612–1698)
Charles Boyle, 2nd Earl of Burlington, 3rd Earl of Cork (1660–1704)
Richard Boyle, 3rd Earl of Burlington, 4th Earl of Cork (1694–1753)

Earls of Burlington; Second creation (1831)
George Augustus Henry Cavendish, 1st Earl of Burlington (1754–1834)
William Cavendish (1783–1812)
William Cavendish, 2nd Earl of Burlington (1808–1891) (succeeded as Duke of Devonshire in 1858)

See Duke of Devonshire for further succession.

See also
Cavendish family
Earl of Cork
Baron Clifford
Burlington Estate

References

Extinct earldoms in the Peerage of England
Cavendish family
Earl
Burlington Estate

Earldoms in the Peerage of the United Kingdom
Noble titles created in 1664
Noble titles created in 1831
Noble titles created for UK MPs